Wabamun  is a hamlet in central Alberta, Canada within Parkland County. It held village status prior to 2021.

History 
Wabamun was named for its location on the north shore of Lake Wabamun. The first post office opened in Wabamun in 1903. In the early 1900s, Wabamun was a railway stop for homesteaders. Many brought goods and animals on train cars as far as Wabamun and then transferred to wagons drawn by oxen or horses for the remainder of trips to homesteads in the Lac Ste. Anne area.

Wabamun has twice incorporated as a village and twice dissolved from village status. Wabamun first incorporated as a village on July 18, 1912. It then relinquished its village status on January 1, 1946. Wabamun incorporated as a village a second time on January 1, 1980. It relinquished its village status for a second time on January 1, 2021,  when it dissolved to become a hamlet under the jurisdiction of Parkland County.

Demographics 

In the 2016 Census of Population conducted by Statistics Canada, Wabamun recorded a population of 682 living in 270 of its 290 total private dwellings, a  change from its 2011 population of 661.

In the 2011 Census, Wabamun had a population of 661 living in 265 of its 295 total dwellings, a 10% change from its 2006 population of 601.

The population of Wabamun according to its 2009 municipal census is 662.

Economy 

The main source of income within Wabamun are power plants located in the area operated by TransAlta Utilities. The power plant within Wabamun was closed because of increased pressure from environmental agencies and aging. The Wabamun power plant was the subject of heated debate among the residents and cottagers of Wabamun Lake. Due to the lack of a cool–off pond, the water used to cool the internal systems was deposited back into the lake, which enhanced the weed population dramatically.

As of March 31, 2010, the Wabamun Generating Station was decommissioned, with the smoke stacks being demolished on March 18, 2017.

Tourism 
A large cabin-going community exists in Wabamun during the summer, while the community is populated year round. Local sites include Wabamun Lake, Waterfront Park, the Wabamun Marina, the 380' pier and world's largest dragonfly. Businesses include 4 restaurants, hardware store, bowling lanes, post office, pharmacy, senior centre, realtor, liquor store, market, car wash, laundromat, motel, hotel, Inn, tavern, bottle depot, convenience store, 2 banks, mechanic and a grocery store.

There are currently plans for development to promote the community as a major visitor destination in central Alberta. These plans include further expansion of Waterfront Park, the largest boat launch on the lake, as well as Discovery Wharf, a project being undertaken that will see the development of app. 100 acres of lakefront property.

The lake itself has a large population of northern pike along with whitefish and Perch.

A smaller club is located on the opposite shore of the lake.

It is home to "Canada's largest dragonfly", a metal statue similar to other attractions to be found across the region.

Oil spill 

On August 3, 2005, 45 cars of a CN Rail train derailed on the shores of Wabamun Lake, west of Wabamun, spilling their contents of more than 700,000 litres of a variety of fuel oils and pole treating oils into the lake.

Infrastructure 
Wabamun and District Museum

Wabamun Public Library

Wabamun School - Parkland School Division (K-9)

Waterfront Park - lakeshore access, parking and full-sized boat launch, picnic area with shelter, washrooms and change rooms, playground and water spray park water spray park.

See also 
List of communities in Alberta
List of hamlets in Alberta

References

External links 

1912 establishments in Alberta
1946 disestablishments in Alberta
1980 establishments in Alberta
2021 disestablishments in Alberta
Edmonton Metropolitan Region
Hamlets in Alberta